The  Washington Redskins season was the franchise's 9th season in the National Football League (NFL) and their 4th in Washington, D.C. The team improved on their 6–3–2 record from 1939, finishing at 9–2.  They would end the season by losing the NFL Championship to the Chicago Bears, 73–0.

Schedule

Postseason

Standings

Washington
Washington Redskins seasons
Washington